A constitutional referendum was held in São Tomé and Príncipe on 22 August 1990. The new constitution would introduce multi-party democracy for the first time since independence, as well as limiting the President to two terms. It was approved by 95.3% of voters. Parliamentary and presidential elections were held the following year.

Results

References

São Tomé
1990 in São Tomé and Príncipe
Referendums in São Tomé and Príncipe
São Tomé
São Tomé